Scrobipalpa remota is a moth in the family Gelechiidae. It was described by Povolný in 1972. It is found in northern Iran, Palestine and Algeria.

The forewings are covered with mixed ashy-grey and light black-tipped scales. The hindwings are graphite grey with darker margins.

Subspecies
Scrobipalpa remota remota
Scrobipalpa remota ceratoides (Falkovitsh & Bidzilya, 2006) (Uzbekistan)

References

Scrobipalpa
Moths described in 1972